The fifth season of the Australian competitive cooking competition show My Kitchen Rules premiered on the Seven Network on 27 January 2014.

Format changes
The Food Truck — From the Top 12 to Top 9 rounds, teams were divided into two groups, cooking in a restaurant-like environment. Members of the public were served the dishes and paid for what they believed the meal was worth. The group that made the most money won the challenge whilst the losing group had to compete in a following cook-off to avoid elimination. The truck was run by chef, Colin Fassnidge.
The Jury — From the Top 12 to Top 9 cook-off rounds, a jury was present and were able to save/send one of the competing teams to/from elimination. The jury was formed by the teams from the winning group of the Food Truck, and, if applicable, the People's Choice winner.
People Choice Winners — A slight change of rules was used for this season due to the inclusion of the Food Truck. Unlike previous seasons, the winner did not always receive immunity from elimination. To ensure there were even teams for the Food Truck, some winners were given an advantage instead, such as being able to select the teams or ingredients. This was applicable to People's Choice challenges 2 & 4.
Ultimate Instant Restaurant — The Top 5 teams headed back home to compete in an Ultimate Instant Restaurant round. They had to prepare two dishes for each course, with guest teams having the choice of which dish they wanted to order.

Teams

Elimination history

Competition details

Instant Restaurants 
During the Instant Restaurant rounds, each team hosts a three-course dinner for judges and fellow teams in their allocated group. They are scored and ranked among their group, with the lowest scoring team being eliminated.

Round 1
 Episodes 1 to 6
 Airdate — 27 January to 4 February
 Description — The first of the two instant restaurant groups are introduced into the competition in Round 1. The lowest scoring team at the end of this round is eliminated.

Round 2
 Episodes 7 to 12
 Airdate — 5 February to 16 February
 Description — The second group now start their Instant Restaurant round. The same rules from the previous round apply and the lowest scoring team is eliminated.

Round 3 (Gatecrasher Round)
 Episodes 13 to 18 
 Airdate — 17 February to 25 February
 Description — In the third round of instant restaurants, the three lowest scoring safe teams in the first two groups combined, were to compete in another instant restaurant round. From here, three newly introduced 'gatecrasher' teams also joined the round. As per the first two rounds, the same format of scoring is repeated and the lowest scoring team is eliminated .

Top 12

People's Choice 1: Breakfast at Central
 Episode 19
 Airdate — 26 February 2014
 Location — Central railway station, Sydney
 Description — Teams must cook and serve a convenient, on-the-go breakfast for Sydney's commuters at Central Station. The public voted for their favourite dish, with the team receiving the most votes, safe from elimination. Pete and Manu decided on the weakest team to head into the first Sudden Death cook-off.

Food Truck 1: Cronulla, NSW
 Episode 20
 Airdate — 2 March 2014
 Location — North Cronulla Beach, NSW
 Description — Teams are split into two groups (white aprons and black aprons) and must each run a restaurant for real paying customers. Each group consists of five teams and must cook an appetiser, two mains and two desserts. One team from each group is assigned as Head Chef and Maître d' and must make sure their group have their food orders ready and in line for service. The group that earns the most money is safe from elimination, while the losing group face a kitchen cook-off.

Kitchen Cook-off
 Episode 21
 Airdate — 3 March 2014
 Description — The Kitchen cook-off is divided into two parts. 
Rapid cook-off: Meat & 3 Veg — Teams must create a 'Meat & 3 Veg' dish in 45 minutes. The selection of meat (pork, chicken, beef, duck or lamb) was determined by the bench they chose to stand at. Any three vegetables were able to be used. In a new twist, the remaining safe teams became The Jury and were able to save one of the teams through a blind tasting. A second team was saved by Pete and Manu. 
Showdown: Family Favourites — The remaining three teams headed into the Showdown, where they were challenged to cook a family favourite meal in one hour. The weakest team from here heads into the Sudden Death cook-off against Uel & Shannelle.

Sudden Death
 Episode 22
 Airdate — 4 March 2014
 Description — The first Sudden Death cook-off for the series. Each team must produce a three-course menu for guest judges and Pete and Manu. Following its success from last year, blind tastings were re-introduced as the judging format. All judges score the entire menu out of 10 and the lower scoring team is eliminated.

Top 11

People's Choice 2: School Lunch
 Episode 23
 Airdate — 5 March 2014
 Location — Bankstown Public School
 Description — For this challenge, teams headed back to primary school to create a healthy lunch for 200 kids. The students voted for their favourite lunch, with one team winning the Children's Choice. On the other end, Pete and Manu sent one team directly into the next Sudden Death cook-off. The Children's Choice winners will gain an advantage at the next Food Truck challenge.

Food Truck 2: Melbourne, Vic
 Episode 24
 Airdate — 9 March 2014
 Location — Australian Centre for Contemporary Art, Southbank, Victoria
 Description — The Food Truck has arrived in Melbourne, where teams are once again, split into two groups and each running competing restaurants. As winners of the previous People's Choice challenge, Uel and Shannelle were able to handpick their group members and form the white group. The remaining teams were formed as the black group. In the end, the group that earned the least money is sent to the Kitchen cook-off to determine the next team going into Sudden Death.

Kitchen Cook-off
 Episode 25
 Airdate — 10 March 2014
 Description — Two cook-offs were held. Two teams selected by the judges and teams' jury were safe after the rapid cook-off. The remaining three teams headed into the following showdown. The lowest performing team from here heads into the Sudden Death cook-off.
Rapid cook-off: Fridge Favourites — Teams had to create a dish using ingredients from a stranger's fridge. Through Facebook, fans of the show shared their list of ingredients in their fridges and five of them were used in this challenge
Showdown: Judge's Ingredients — For this challenge, teams used ingredients that judges, Pete and Manu use in their own fridge. Each judge had two crates of the same ingredients on offer and contestants were able choose which judge's ingredients they wish to use. As there were only three teams, one of the judge's crates was not used.

Sudden Death
 Episode 26
 Airdate — 11 March 2014
 Description — Two NSW teams must compete in another Sudden Death cook-off, after their low performances during previous challenges. Both teams must serve a three course meal to Pete, Manu and guest judges for a blind tasting. The winner is safe and through to the Top 10. The lower scoring team is eliminated from the competition

Top 10

People's Choice 3: Italian Festival
 Episode 27
 Airdate — 12 March 2014
 Location — Norton Street, Leichhardt, NSW
 Description — Teams headed to Sydney's Norton Street in Leichhardt to serve Mediterranean meals for the annual Italian Festival. Teams had a total of 3 hours to shop at the local Italian grocers and market, cook and serve their meals to the festival-goers. The public voted for their favourite dish and the team with the most votes was safe from elimination. The judges sent the weakest team into the next Sudden Death cook-off.

Food Truck 3: Parramatta, NSW
 Episode 28
 Airdate — 16 March 2014
 Location — Parramatta, NSW
 Description — The Food Truck has returned to Sydney, and the teams are once again split into two (white aprons vs. black aprons). This time, they are serving multicultural foods of multiple nationalities. Carly and Tresne were selected to be the White groups' Head chef and Maître d', while Uel and Shannelle were selected to be Head Chef and Maître d' for the black group. The group that made the most money is safe and the group that makes the least is sent to Kitchen cook-off to determine the next team going into sudden death.

Kitchen Cook-off
 Episode 29
 Airdate — 17 March 2014
 Description — Chicken or Egg
For the rapid cook-off, teams had 45 minutes to cook either a chicken or egg dish. Two teams cooked with chicken and the other two with eggs. In a special twist the two chicken dishes competed against each other and the same for the two egg dishes. The jury and the judges sent the worst chicken and egg team through to the Showdown. In the Showdown, the two teams will cook another dish with chicken or egg using the opposite ingredient from the previous cook-off.

Sudden Death
 Episode 30
 Airdate — 18 March 2014
 Description — Two Victorian teams, the twins, Helena and Vikki and the boys, Harry and Christo competed in a Sudden Death cook-off after their low performances at previous challenges. Both teams must cook their best three course meal for host and guest judges for scoring. The twins brought upon their Greek heritage, cooking dishes inspired by their grandmother, whilst the boys took a more casual approach, dishing up their favourite meals as mates. The lower scoring team is eliminated as the winning team advances to the Top 9.

Top 9

People's Choice 4: Builder's Site BBQ 
 Episode 31
 Airdate — 19 March 2014
 Location — Central Park, Sydney
 Description — Teams headed into the Central Park development worksite to cook a barbecue lunch for 200 builders. Teams were inspired by a number of cuisines including Asian and South American for their lunches. The worksite builders voted for their favourite dish, with the team receiving the most votes winning the Builder's Choice. This team will gain an advantage at the following Food Truck in Brisbane. The weakest team will go directly into the next Sudden Death cook-off.

Food Truck 4: Brisbane, Qld
 Episode 32
 Airdate — 23 March 2014
 Location — Brisbane, Qld
 Description — Teams were back on board the Food Truck, once again split into two groups, running and serving two restaurants for paying customers in Brisbane's CBD. As winners of the previous People's Choice challenge, Chloe, Kelly and the Black group were able to allocate 4 out of 8 main ingredients for their three-course menu. The black group chose Mackerel for the appetiser, squid and lamb for mains and fresh fruit for dessert. The remaining four ingredients were given to the opposing White group, which included, Moreton Bay bugs for appetiser, kangaroo and spatchcock for mains and finally assorted nuts for dessert. As per usual, customers will pay for what they believe the meal is worth, and the losing group will compete in a Kitchen cook-off. This was the last Food Truck challenge and also the largest, serving a total of 150 customers, previous Food Trucks only had 100.

Kitchen Cook-off
 Episode 33
 Airdate — 24 March 2014
 Description — The losing four teams from the Food Truck will face a rapid cook-off. The two best teams selected by the jury and judges will be saved, whilst the bottom two compete in another Showdown. The weakest team from here will head into Sudden Death.
Rapid cook-off: Romantic Meal — For the rapid cook-off, teams were challenged to create a romantic meal in 45 minutes, however after teams retrieved their ingredients, they learnt that for this challenge, only one team member can cook, while the other may only taste and advise.
Showdown: Chocolate — In the Showdown, the losing teams battled it out in a Chocolate challenge, to create their best dish using chocolate. According to the judges, both teams presented a poor dish, making the decision to send one team into Sudden Death more difficult than intended.

Sudden Death
 Episode 34
 Airdate — 25 March 2014
 Description — Two teams go head to head in Sudden Death. Both teams presented a three course meal for guest and host judges for scoring and the lower scoring team is eliminated. From Victoria,  Josh and Danielle dubbed the 'scientists' of the competition took upon their molecular gastronomy skills, while New South Wales newlyweds, Uel and Shannelle kept to their Asian heritage for their menus.  For Uel and Shannelle, they are the only team so far to have competed in a Sudden Death more than once.

Top 8

People's Choice 5: Pop-Up Restaurant
 Episode 35
 Airdate — 26 March 2014
 Location — Eveleigh Markets at Carriageworks, Redfern
 Description — After gaining all their skills from the Food Truck challenges, teams today opened their own pop-up restaurants serving one main meal to customers. All teams were in charge of cooking, waiting and serving at their own restaurants. Customers dining, paid for what they thought the meal was worth, with the team receiving the most money, winning People's Choice and safe from elimination. Pete and Manu, as always chose the weakest to head straight into Sudden Death. For the middle six teams, the rank order of money earned became the seeding process for the next cook-off in Kitchen Headquarters.

Kitchen cook-off
 Episode 36
 Airdate — 30 March 2014
 Description
Rapid Cook-off: One on One: — The six teams were to compete head to head with another team in a 30-minute rapid cook-off. The money ranking from the previous challenge determined how the game process will be played out. As Bree and Jessica received the most money out of the six, they were able to choose their opponent, however their opponent determined which protein both teams will use to cook. In this case, Thalia and Bianca were the selected opponent and chose game meats as the protein. Next in line was Cathy and Anna, choosing Helena and Vikki as their opponent. They then chose lamb as the protein. Out of the two remaining teams, Josh and Danielle had made more money than Chloe and Kelly, but since they were left with no choice of opponent, they were able to choose the protein and decided on fish. The three winning teams from each head to head became safe from elimination, while the three losing teams headed into the next Showdown.
Showdown: Entree, Main, Dessert:— As the losing teams from the previous head to head battles, they must now cook one course out of Entree, Main and Dessert in an hour. Only one team can cook one course and this was decided in a verbal first-say-first-go basis between the three teams. The losing team from this Showdown, headed into Sudden Death with Carly and Tresne.

Sudden Death
 Episode 37
 Airdate — 31 March 2014
 Description — SA mums face Carly & Tresne in a Sudden Death cook-off. Teams cooked a three-course menu for guest and host judges, the winning team advances to the Top 7 Finals Decider, while the losing team is eliminated. Both teams received excellent feedback for their entree and dessert however both fell short on their main and had issues cooking their meat. The judges scores resulted in a one-point difference between the winner and loser. For Carly and Tresne, it was their second time competing in a Sudden Death elimination.

Top 7

Farmer's Challenge
 Episode 38
 Airdate — 1 April 2014
 Description — In Kitchen Headquarters, teams cooked meals for the farmers and suppliers of the fresh produce used by the show. It was a celebratory feast to honour and acknowledge their great efforts. Teams had 90 minutes to prepare their dishes right under the watchful eye of the farmers, who all voted for their favourite meal. Judges, Pete and Manu chose the winning team, to be safe from the next two eliminations. The farmers' vote count of the remaining six teams allocated them into two Knock-out groups. 2nd, 4th and 6th place will face off in Group 1 and 1st, 3rd and 5th for Group 2.

 Note:
  - Due to urgent family matters at home, Chloe and Kelly were absent and did not compete in this challenge.

Knock-out: Group 1
 Episode 39
 Airdate — 2 April 2014
 Description — The Knock-out round is split into three parts; The first part was a skills test which required teams to fillet a fish in 10 minutes. The team that did the best job gained an advantage of allocating a main ingredient for themselves and the other teams to use in the second challenge. These included; brains, lemon & limes and ocean trout. Teams must produce a dish with their allocated ingredient in one hour, one team is safe while the other two go into a final Sudden Death round. For this, teams must produce their signature dish for scoring by the guest and host judges, the lower scoring team is eliminated. The two surviving teams advance to the Top 5 finals round.

Knock-out: Group 2
 Episode 40
 Airdate — 7 April 2014
 Description — The next three teams competed in Group 2 of the knock-outs to secure the last two remaining spots in the Top 5. The first skills test, required teams to successfully truss a piece of beef. Whichever team did the neatest and most successful job gained the advantage to allocate a main ingredient for themselves and the other teams to cook with. Ingredients on offer included, beef, skate wings and chocolate. With their allocated ingredient, teams had one hour to create a dish for judging. One team is safe while the other two head into a final Sudden Death round. Teams must now cook their signature dish to host and guest judges for scoring, the lower scoring team was eliminated while the surviving team takes the last spot in the Top 5.

Top 5

Ultimate Instant Restaurant
 Episodes 41 to 45
 Airdate — 8 April to 23 April
 Description — The Top 5 teams headed around the country again to compete in an Ultimate Instant restaurant round. All five teams invited their fellow opposing finalists to their homes for a three-course dinner. Unlike the initial rounds, teams now have to cook two dishes of each course and guest teams were able to select any one of each course. Pete and Manu each tried one of the two options, which means they do not score the same dish. The lowest scoring team for this round is eliminated as the top 4 are ranked into the Semi-Finals.

 Colour key:
  – Score for Option 1
  – Score for Option 2

Semifinals

Semifinal 1
 Episode 46
 Airdate — 27 April 2014
 Description — Paul and Blair face-off Chloe and Kelly in the first semifinal. Teams must cook a three-course meal for guest judges and Pete and Manu, following the Sudden Death format. The winning team advances into the Grand Final as the losing team is eliminated.

Semifinal 2
 Episode 47
 Airdate — 28 April 2014
 Description — The final spot in the Grand final is up for grabs during the second semi-final. Bree and Jessica take on Helena and Vikki for the last time in a three-course Sudden death cook-off. The losing team is eliminated as the winner heads into the Grand Final to face Chloe and Kelly.

Grand Final 
 Episode 48
 Airdate — 29 April 2014
 Description — In the final cook-off for the series, the top 2 teams face-off in the ultimate Grand Final. Teams must cook a 5 course meal and serve 20 plates for each course to all eliminated teams, friends and family. Guest judges returned for the final verdict of awarding the $250,000 prize to the winners.

Ratings
 Colour key:
  – Highest rating during the series
  – Lowest rating during the series
  – An elimination was held in this episode
  – Finals week

 Notes:
  South Australian viewers excluded.
Ratings data used is from OzTAM and represents the consolidated viewership from the 5 largest Australian metropolitan centres (Sydney, Melbourne, Brisbane, Perth and Adelaide).

References 

2014 Australian television seasons
My Kitchen Rules